Richard Abidin Breen (born 29 June 1979), better known as Abz Love, is an English rapper, singer, songwriter, DJ, producer and TV personality. Love was a member and the lead singer of the boy band Five. In 2003, Love released his debut solo album Abstract Theory, which earned him a further three top-ten hits.

After years out of the spotlight, Love featured on ITV2's The Big Reunion in 2012. In 2013 he appeared on All Star Mr & Mrs and became the runner-up for Channel 5's Celebrity Big Brother 12. In 2015, Love starred in BBC Two's documentary series Country Strife: Abz on the Farm, followed by a Christmas special titled Country Strife: Abz on the Christmas Farm.

Early life
Richard Abiden Breen was born in London to Turkish father Turan Sanveren and Irish mother Kathleen Breen. He was raised on a council estate in Hackney, East London where he was brought up until he left home at 16 to join boyband Five. He won a scholarship to attend the Italia Conti Stage School where he studied acting. One day his teacher suggested he audition for a boy band that was being groomed by Simon Cowell.

After performing in front of Cowell and a panel of managers, Love was chosen from over 3,000 auditionees to be in the band Five (also known as 5ive). He changed his name to Abs in order avoid confusion with bandmate Ritchie Neville.

Five went on to have international success winning a Brit Award for Best Pop Act 2000, an MTV award and ASCAP awards for songwriting. Love and fellow Five members Jason "J" Brown and Sean Conlon were involved in writing many of the band's hits such as "Everybody Get Up", "Keep On Movin'" and "If Ya Gettin' Down".

Career

1997–2001: Career with Five
Five (stylised as 5ive) were a successful British boy band in the '90s consisting of members Richard Abidin Love (Abz), Jason Brown (J), Sean Conlon, Ritchie Neville, and Scott Robinson. Formed in 1997 by father/son management team Bob Herbert and Chris Herbert of Safe Management, the same team that originally formed the Spice Girls, the band went on to be signed by music industry boss and A&R Simon Cowell, who at the time was a music executive at Sony BMG. Based on current BPI certifications, Five have sold over 1.6 million albums and 2 million singles in the UK alone. The band split up on 27 September 2001 when new father Robinson convinced the other members to take a break. Love has since stated on ITV2's The Big Reunion that he "did not want the band to split and wanted to continue", saying "It felt like they were taking something away from me".

2001–2003: Solo career and debut album
After Five split, Love was signed to Sony BMG by Simon Cowell as a solo artist and became the only band member to release a solo album. Abstract Theory had three top 10 hits on the UK Singles Chart with "What You Got" ( 4), "Stop Sign" (No. 10), and "Miss Perfect" (No. 5). Plans for "7 Ways" as the fourth single were scrapped despite the fact a music video was filmed for it. Abstract Theory reached No. 29 on the UK Albums Chart, leading him to be dropped by Sony in December 2003.

He later changed the spelling of his name to Abz. In a January 2013 interview on BBC Radio 1, he said: "I got a bit annoyed with everybody [constantly] referencing the six-pack".

2012–2013: The Big Reunion and Celebrity Big Brother 12
On 18 October 2012, it was revealed via Twitter that Five would be taking part in an ITV2 documentary series called The Big Reunion, which also featured Atomic Kitten, Blue, 911, Honeyz, B*witched and Liberty X and followed their journey as they prepared for a comeback show at Hammersmith Apollo. The Big Reunion aired in January 2013 and was an unexpected hit for ITV2, with each episode averaging 1 million viewers. The show revealed what had happened to the bands after finding fame, with Five's stories, both as a band and as individuals, heavily featured on the show. In episode 4, Love gave the audience a tour of his vegetable garden and showed off his "curly carrots", which subsequently trended on Twitter. Love's eccentric choices of headwear, particularly his "rainbow unicorn hat", garnered him attention from fans.

Love entered the Celebrity Big Brother house on 22 August 2013. When asked by presenter Emma Willis why he was doing the show, he responded, "I need a home [because] I'm currently living with my aunty Wendy". While Love has never confirmed how much he was paid to do the show, it has been speculated that he was offered a £100,000 fee. Whilst in the house, Love confessed in the diary room that he has Asperger syndrome, a mild form of autism. On 13 September, Love was announced as the Celebrity Big Brother 12 runner-up, behind Charlotte Crosby.

2014: Leaving Five via Twitter
In August 2014 Love announced via Twitter that he had left Five, stating: "As of today I am no longer a member of 5ive, thank you to all the fans who supported. I love you all"." Since Love's exit, his former bandmates continue to tour nightclubs as a three-piece using the name Five.

2015: Country Strife: Abz on the Farm
After a brief attempt at rural living in Lincolnshire from 2011 to 2013, Love decided to buy a smallholding in rural Wales with his partner and manager Vicky Fallon. Fallon felt that Love's transition to farmer would make for entertaining viewing, so she contacted executive producer and owner of Norfolk-based production company Tin Can Island, Andrea Cornes. Cornes presented the project to Tom Mcdonald at BBC2, who commissioned the series.

The docu-series Country Strife: Abz on the Farm aired on BBC Two in August 2015, with the BBC camera crew following the couple's journey throughout 2014 as they purchased a dilapidated smallholding and adjusted to rural life on a budget. BBC Two were criticised by some viewers for Love's appearance on the channel, which was felt to be at odds with the majority of their content, but Love became a cult hit with viewers and critics alike.

On 8 September 2015, Love put his Brit Award for Best Pop Act 2000 up for auction on eBay. The morning the auction went live he announced his plans on The Wright Stuff, explaining that he hoped to raise some funds for "topsoil and some gardening tools" for his farm. The bidding started at 99p and Abz constructed a tongue-in-cheek item description to go with the award. The high level of media interest in the auction resulted in bids rapidly rising, eventually reaching over £1 million. Love was reportedly made several offers to end the auction early (including a Ferrari sports car), but turned them down believing that the 1 million bid was real. The day before the auction ended eBay's fraud squad cancelled the account, denying him the chance to see if the top bid was genuine.

In January 2016, Abz released his first solo single in over a decade, a comedy track called "Cockadoodledoo" with the hope of raising money for his farming project.

2019–present: Boyz on Block
Since 2019, he has been part of the supergroup called Boyz on Block, composed of Another Level's Dane Bowers, Boyzone's Shane Lynch and Phats & Small's Ben Ofoedu. On 20 November 2020, the group released their first single, a cover of East 17's 1994 single "Stay Another Day", featuring Tony Mortimer. They released their second single during February 2021, a cover of K-Ci & JoJo's "All My Life". Neither single appeared on the official UK charts.

On 27 October 2021, Channel 4 announced Love would be taking part in the tenth series of Celebs Go Dating, alongside Ulrika Jonsson, Ryan-Mark Parsons, Miles Nazaire, Chloe Brockett, Nikita Jasmine, Marty McKenna and Jessika Power. The series began airing in January 2022.

Personal life
Love dated singer/songwriter Vicky Fallon starting in 2009 and the couple were subsequently engaged. They split in 2017. In October 2014 Love bought a dilapidated smallholding in Carmarthenshire, Wales.

Discography

Studio albums

Extended plays

Singles

Featured

References

External links

 Official website
 Abz Love on Twitter
 Abz Love on Facebook
 Abz on the farm (TV Show) on Facebook
 Love Farm on Facebook
 Abz Love on IMDb

1979 births
Living people
Alumni of the Italia Conti Academy of Theatre Arts
English male rappers
English male singers
English people of Irish descent
English people of Turkish descent
English pop singers
British contemporary R&B singers
Five (band) members
People from Hackney Central
People with Asperger syndrome
Rappers from London
Singers from London
Sony Music Publishing artists
BT Digital Music Awards winners